Bactrognathidae is an extinct family of conodonts in the order Prioniodinida.

Genera are Bactrognathus, Doliognathus, and Staurognathus.

References

External links 

 Bactrognathidae at fossilworks.org (retrieved 22 April 2016)

Conodont families
Prioniodinida